Mendip Rail Ltd is an independent freight operating railway company in Great Britain. It is a joint venture composed of the rail-operation divisions of Aggregate Industries (formerly Foster Yeoman) and Hanson Aggregates (previously ARC).

The company operates aggregate trains from the quarries of the Mendip Hills in South-West England, to London and South-East England. The Foster Yeoman quarries are at Torr Works and Dulcote Quarry, while Hanson has plants at Batts Combe Quarry and Whatley Quarry.

The company operates four Class 59/0 diesel locomotives owned by Aggregate Industries and four Class 59/1 locomotives owned by Hanson. In addition, two SW1001 Switchers are owned and operated at Whatley and Merehead quarries. It owns Merehead Traction Maintenance Depot (Merehead TMD) where the eight locomotives are allocated. They can also be seen at Hither Green TMD or Eastleigh Works where they receive heavy maintenance.

Foster Yeoman

Foster Yeoman purchased its own fleet of 140 12-ton wagons in 1923, to take advantage of the fact that the Great Western Railway line ran adjacent to Dulcote Quarry. When the Torr Works opened in the 1960s, a rail terminal – named Merehead after the old quarry – was constructed to support the new quarry and was opened in August 1970, served by a spur from the East Somerset branch line which joins the main line at Witham. Further expansion was soon needed, with a chord being added between the terminal and the branch line in 1973.

 British Rail shunting and mainline locomotives were used initially, but in 1972 Foster Yeoman bought the first of several Class 08 shunting engines. The company also has a General Motors EMD SW1001 switching locomotive which was purchased in 1980.

As a result of poor reliability of the various locomotives used by British Rail to haul stone trains from the West Country (with availability of the Class 56 locomotives from May 1984 as low as 30%, and only 60% of trains running on time), Foster Yeoman began negotiations with British Rail to improve service. Having already supplied its own wagons (with a reliability level of 96%) Foster Yeoman suggested to British Rail that it could operate its own locomotives, which would be the first privately-owned engines to run on British rail tracks. British Rail's problem was the hard tie-in and control of the rail unions, but nevertheless BR accepted the principle.

Foster Yeoman issued a tender document which requested 95% reliability. General Motors' bid was ultimately successful, in particular because their proposed design, derived from the EMD SD40-2, was equipped with the well-proven Super Series creep control, which allows superior traction at very low speeds. This, it was found, would enable a single locomotive to haul Foster Yeoman's 4,300 tonne stone trains, whilst two Class 56 or Class 58 engines would be needed to move the same load. This enabled Foster Yeoman to reduce its requirement from the original six locomotives to four.

The contract with General Motors was signed in November 1984 and the new locomotives, built at the GM plant in La Grange, Illinois, were shipped across the Atlantic in January 1986. The JT26CW-SS, newly designated as British Rail Class 59/0, had a cab layout taken from the Class 58, to make driver assimilation easier, and to meet the British loading gauge a considerable amount of redesign work and various compromises were required from the original GM prototype. Once in the United Kingdom, further tests were undertaken before Foster Yeoman's new locomotives entered service in February 1986. They were officially named in a ceremony at Merehead on 28 June 1986.

The Class 59s delivered 99% reliability, leading Foster Yeoman to order a fifth engine in 1988. In their first ten years of operation the five locomotives between them hauled over 50 million tonnes of aggregates away from Merehead.

The four former-Yeoman locomotives still operated by Mendip Rail are:
59001 Yeoman Endeavour
59002 Alan J Day (formerly Yeoman Enterprise)
59004 Paul A Hammond (formerly Yeoman Challenger)
59005 Kenneth J Painter

59003 Yeoman Highlander was exported to Germany in 1997, renumbered as 259 003, and operated by Yeoman/Deutsche Bahn (DB), pulling stone trains. It has since been sold on to Heavy Haul Power International where it is still working on coal trains and pulls the highest train weight of any locomotive presently in Germany. On 19 August 2014, GB Railfreight (GBRF) confirmed it had purchased 59003 and planned to return it to the UK to haul GBRF freight trains by the end of 2014.

However, the so-called 'mega train' experiment was not fully successful, as a coupling in the centre of the train broke.

Hanson ARC

The four Class 59/1 locomotives owned by Hanson Aggregates (parent company of the former owner ARC) are similar to the Class 59/0 locomotives of Foster Yeoman and were built by General Motors Diesel Division at its London, Ontario plant in 1990.

The four Hanson locomotives operated by Mendip Rail are:
59101 Village of Whatley
59102 Village of Chantry
59103 Village of Mells
59104 Village of Great Elm

Shunting locomotives
Both Foster Yeoman and ARC operated shunting locomotives at their quarries which are managed by Mendip Rail. Forster Yeoman originally used second hand British Rail Class 08s but later bought an EMD SW1001, a precursor to their buying the fleet of Class 59s. ARC operated modern Thomas Hill Vanguard and Steelman shunters. After Mendip Rail was established, some locomotives have been moved between the two quarries and also the Foster Yeoman terminal at Isle of Grain.

Merger and operations

To better manage their fleet availability and scale needs, Hanson ARC and Foster Yeoman founded Mendip Rail in 1993. The assets are still owned by the parent companies and the staff are seconded to Mendip Rail.

The eight locomotives display four different liveries:
 Old Foster Yeoman livery (predominantly silver)
 New Foster Yeoman livery (silver and blue, Yeoman logo)
 Hanson livery (silver and blue, Hanson logo)
 Mendip Rail livery (silver, green and orange, MRL logo)

Mendip Rail's class 59s work services between various destinations which have changed over time according to demand and specific contracts. They have worked regularly over southern railway tracks, for example to the former Foster Yeoman terminals at Eastleigh and Botley, as well as delivering aggregates for construction work on the Thames Barrier, Second Severn Crossing, Channel Tunnel and most recently Heathrow Terminal 5, which required 3 million tonnes of stone.

, Mendip Rail hauled about 4.5 million tonnes of stone from Torr Works each year, and about 2.5 million tonnes from Whatley Quarry.

Contracting out 
Services are operated in partnership with Freightliner, using Freightliner's fourteen Class 59 locomotives, comprising 59/0 (four), 59/1 (four) and 59/2 (a fleet of six built for National Power in 1994 and 1995). The operations are also supported with around ten Class 66s. The class 59 locomotives, along with the Mendip Rail contract, were handed over from DB Cargo on 3 November 2019.

Incidents

12 September 2000

While working the 6A20 Whatley Quarry to Acton (West London) stone train,  59103 Village of Mells and the first ten hopper wagons derailed at 23:20 on 12 September 2000 between Great Elm Tunnel and Bedlam Tunnel on the single track branch line to the Hanson Quarry at Whatley. The locomotive and the first two hoppers rolled, and 59103 came to rest on the parapet of a small bridge on the driver's side (left by direction of travel) with the trailing bogie partially torn off by the following hopper car. The locomotive was pulled upright on 19 September 2000 and removed to Whatley Quarry where an initial assessment of the damage was made and repairs made to make the locomotive safe for removal by road.

6 October 2008

 Shortly before 17:30 on 6 October 2008 a mainline engine, which had earlier departed the Whatley Quarry depot, was hit from behind by a runaway train on the quarry branch line at Bedlam, near Great Elm.

The runaway train consisted of a shunter hauling sixteen loaded stone wagons, weighing a total of 1,700 tones. It had been engaged in marshalling duties with another train in the quarry sidings, when there was a mechanical  failure of the handle controlling the train's main air brake. The crew had attempted to stop the train by applying the shunter's direct air brake; however, this was overcome by the momentum of the moving wagons. The Driver's Safety Device (deadman's pedal) in the shunter was disabled by a feature that allowed the driver to leave his seat to observe the passage of the train provided that the shunter's direct air brake had been applied. Had that brake been released and the deadman's pedal allowed to operate, the train's main air brakes would have applied automatically and stopped the train. Trap points, which might have prevented the runaway from leaving the sidings and joining the branch line, had not been reset after the departure of the mainline train.

The shunter's crew had abandoned the locomotive before the impact and there were no serious injuries as a result of the accident.

The shunter, which by the time of the impact had already suffered damage due to passing through a tunnel which was too low for it, was derailed, as were the first five stone wagons; four of those wagons completely left the branch line and travelled down a steep embankment. The shunter suffered significant, but not irreparable, damage, and there was only minor damage to the mainline locomotive. A section of track was completely destroyed.

The Rail Accident Investigation Branch (RAIB) reviewed the accident and decided that it did not warrant undertaking a full investigation. The RAIB did recommend that an additional "brake of last resort" be fitted to the shunter and to similar industrial locomotives. The RAIB also noted the need to consider the use of self-restoring trap points for the quarry sidings.

10 November 2008
At approximately 02:40 the two locomotives hauling the 7A91 Merehead Quarry to Acton Terminal Complex train derailed at East Somerset Junction between Westbury and Castle Cary.

20 March 2017
At 17:50, 7Z15, the 1705 Merehead Quarry to Acton Terminal Complex train, derailed at East Somerset Junction between Westbury and Castle Cary. Rail Accident Investigation Branch (RAIB) inspectors deployed within the hour.

Notes

Rail transport in Somerset
Rail freight companies in the United Kingdom